Thomas Brandon Sullivan (December 19, 1906 – August 16, 1944) was a professional baseball catcher. He played in one game for the 1925 Cincinnati Reds of Major League Baseball (MLB). Sullivan was the first person born in Alaska to play in MLB.

Biography
Baseball records list Sullivan's one game with the Cincinnati Reds in 1925, and 55 games with the minor league Seattle Indians of the Pacific Coast League in 1928.

Sullivan's one major league appearance came on June 14, 1925, with the Reds hosting the Brooklyn Robins at Redland Field (later renamed Crosley Field). Sullivan played defensively at catcher for the final three innings, allowing one passed ball from pitcher Neal Brady. Sullivan had one plate appearance; facing Brooklyn's Dazzy Vance with one out in the ninth inning, he grounded out, shortstop to first. The Cincinnati Enquirer noted that it was Sullivan's first professional game, referring to him as "the big college boy from Seattle". He was released by the Reds on June 29.

Sullivan attended the University of Washington prior to playing professional baseball.

Notes

References

Further reading

External links

1906 births
1944 deaths
Cincinnati Reds players
Seattle Indians players
Baseball players from Alaska
People from Nome, Alaska
University of Washington alumni